Shilenga is a rural locality (a village) in Osinovskoye Rural Settlement of Vinogradovsky District, Arkhangelsk Oblast, Russia. The population was 5 as of 2010.

Geography 
Shilenga is located 14 km southeast of Bereznik (the district's administrative centre) by road. Priluk is the nearest rural locality.

References 

Rural localities in Vinogradovsky District